Gazipur-5 is a constituency represented in the Jatiya Sangsad (National Parliament) of Bangladesh since 2008 by Meher Afroz Chumki of the Awami League.

Boundaries 
The constituency encompasses Kaliganj Upazila, Gazipur City Corporation wards 39 through 42, and one union parishad of Gazipur Sadar Upazila: Baria.

History 
The constituency was created when, ahead of the 2008 general election, the Election Commission redrew constituency boundaries to reflect population changes revealed by the 2001 Bangladesh census. The 2008 redistricting added a new seat to Gazipur District, increasing the number of constituencies in the district from four to five.

Members of Parliament

Elections

Elections in the 2010s 
Meher Afroz Chumki was re-elected unopposed in the 2014 General Election after opposition parties withdrew their candidacies in a boycott of the election.

Elections in the 2000s

References

External links
 

Parliamentary constituencies in Bangladesh
Gazipur District